Albert Mancini (1899–1987) was a professional musician, a virtuoso trumpeter and violinist, and the author of numerous arrangements and etudes for the trumpet.

In 1903, his parents emigrated to the United States from Potenza, Italy, initially settling in Buffalo, New York. Over the course of his career, Mancini played for the United States Marine Band, the Detroit Symphony Orchestra, and the Los Angeles Philharmonic. His advanced trumpet etudes are still used in some university-level music programs.

See also
List of 20th century brass instrumentalists
List of trumpeters
List of violinists

1899 births
1987 deaths
American people of Italian descent
American trumpeters
American male trumpeters
American male violinists
20th-century American violinists
20th-century trumpeters
20th-century American male musicians